Coweta Public School District also known as Coweta Public Schools it is the 29th largest school district in the state of Oklahoma.

As of October 2007 the district had 3,161 pre kindergarten through 12th grade students enrolled in 8 different schools, the district is also the largest in Wagoner County.

List of schools
Grades 10-12 are considered High Schools, grades 7-9 are considered Junior High, and grades pre-K through 6th are considered Elementary.

Secondary schools

High schools
 Coweta High School

Junior high schools
 Coweta Junior High 
 Intermediate High School

Elementary schools
 Mission Intermediate Grade Center 
 Heritage Intermediate Grade Center 
 Central Elementary 
 Northwest Elementary 
 Southside Elementary

Citations

External links
Coweta Public Schools website
Coweta High School Alumni

School districts in Oklahoma
Coweta, Oklahoma
Education in Wagoner County, Oklahoma